; formerly  is a Japanese chemical company, established in 1915, and headquartered in Tokyo, manufacturing organic and inorganic chemicals, cement, special cement additives, electronic component transfer materials and food packaging materials. The company is listed on the Tokyo Stock Exchange and is a constituent of the Nikkei 225 stock index.

History
In 1912, Tsuneichi Fujiyama founded a carbide business, Hokkai Carbide, in Tomakomai, a village in Hokkaido. One year later, Fujiyama patented his own process of producing cyanamide, the continuous cyanamide process. In 1913, Fujiyama with the help of 22 venture capitalists incorporated a reorganized Hokkai Carbide as Denki Kagaku Kogyo, the current company. Despite its legal status as an independent corporation, Denka was a Mitsui-related company. The company changed its name from Denki Kagaku Kogyo to Denka Company Limited 2015.

Pontchartrain Works 
The Pontchartrain Works facility owned by Denka in Reserve, Louisiana has been reported to be emitting chloroprene which is defined as "likely to be carcinogenic to humans" by the EPA. Up to 755 times the safe air value of 0.2 μg/m3 of chloroprene has been recorded at the fifth ward elementary school in close proximity to the plant. The cancer risk in Reserve is 1,500 times the national average and is thought to be due to chloroprene levels. Denka has replied to the reports as being not based on "sound science".

References

External links

 Denka official site 
 Denka Korea (in Korean)

Chemical companies based in Tokyo
Cement companies of Japan
Companies listed on the Tokyo Stock Exchange
Chemical companies established in 1915
Japanese companies established in 1915
Mitsui
Japanese brands